In music, a ninth is a compound interval consisting of an octave plus a second.

Like the second, the interval of a ninth is classified as a dissonance in common practice tonality.  Since a ninth is an octave larger than a second, its sonority level is considered less dense.

Major ninth

A major ninth is a compound musical interval spanning 14 semitones, or an octave plus 2 semitones. If transposed into a single octave, it becomes a major second or minor seventh. The major ninth is somewhat dissonant in sound.

Transposition
Some common transposing instruments sound a major ninth lower than written.
These include the tenor saxophone, the bass clarinet, the baritone/euphonium when written in treble clef, and the trombone when written in treble clef (British brass band music).

When baritone/euphonium or trombone parts are written in bass clef or tenor clef they sound as written.

Minor ninth

A minor ninth (m9 or -9) is a compound musical interval spanning 13 semitones, or 1 semitone above an octave (thus it is enharmonically equivalent to an augmented octave). If transposed into a single octave, it becomes a minor second or major seventh. The minor ninth is rather dissonant in sound, and in European classical music, often appears as a suspension. Béla Bartók wrote a study in minor 9ths for piano. The fourth movement (an intermezzo) of Robert Schumann's Faschingsschwank aus Wien is constructed to feature prominent notes of the melody a minor ninth above the accompaniment:  Alexander Scriabin's Piano Sonata No. 9, 'Black Mass' is based around the interval of a minor ninth, creating an uncomfortable and harsh sound. Several of Igor Stravinsky's works open with a striking gesture that includes the interval of  a minor 9th, either as a chord: Les Noces (1923) and Threni (1958); or as an upward melodic leap: Capriccio for Piano and Orchestra (1929), Symphony in Three Movements (1946), and Movements for Piano and Orchestra (1960).

Augmented ninth

An augmented ninth is a compound musical interval spanning 15 semitones, or 3 semitones above an octave. Enharmonically equivalent to a compound minor third, if transposed into a single octave, it becomes a minor third or major sixth.

See: Dominant seventh sharp ninth chord.

Ninth chords

Three types of ninth chords may be distinguished: dominant (9), major (M9), and minor (m9). They may easily be remembered as the chord quality of the seventh does not change with the addition of the second scale degree, which is a major second in both major and minor, thus:

 0 4 7 t + 2 = dominant seventh + ninth = dominant ninth chord
 0 4 7 e + 2 = major seventh + ninth = major ninth chord
 0 3 7 t + 2 = minor seventh + ninth = minor ninth chord

The dominant ninth (V9) is a dominant seventh plus a major or minor ninth.

See also
Augmented octave
 Augmented unison

References

Chord factors
Seconds (music)
Compound intervals